Shenyang Modern Tram is a tram network operating in Hunnan New District in southern Shenyang, Liaoning province, People's Republic of China.  The tram system mostly uses a traditional overhead line system, but some sections are wireless with the tram running partly on super-capacitor batteries charging at every stop, the first such system in Asia. It is the longest tram system in China.

Shenyang once had the largest tramway network (c. 1925) in China with service completely stopping in 1974. Trams returned in Shenyang with the opening of the Shenyang Modern Tram in 2013.  The whole plan of Shenyang Modern Tram is running from Olympic Centre, near Aotizhongxin station of Shenyang Metro Line 2 to Shenfu Xincheng, Expo Centre and Taoxian Airport. The Shenyang tram system is funded by a BT model investment of CNY 4.82 billion by the construction and RATP Dev Transdev Asia, which is a joint venture between Transdev (formerly Veolia Transport) and RATP Dev. The line is operated by the city-owned "Shenyang Hunnan Modern Transport Co., Ltd" (51%) and RATP Dev Transdev Asia (49%).

Operations

Tickets

Before 1 March 2019, the implementation of a single one-way fare as 2 Yuan. 

Tram payment are tentative to two kinds, cash and IC card.

Tram routes

 1 – Olympic Centre to Expo Centre
 2 – Olympic Centre to Taoxian Airport
 3 – Century Tower to Expo Centre
 4 – Shenyang South to Century Tower
 5 – Olympic Centre to Shenfu Xincheng
 6 – Shenyang South to Taoxian Airport (suspended service since 2020 due to COVID-19 pandemic)

Description
Line 3 run from Century Building (where interchange with a Subway Line 2 station Shijidasha) to Expo Centre via University Science City. At North-Eastern University it meet with Line 1.

Network info

 Total length – 
 Opened – September 15, 2013
 Number of stops – 71
 Number of routes – 6
 Gauge – Standard gauge
 Number of tramcars – 30

Depots & termini

The two tram depots are in Hunnan and Dadianzicun. Terminii are Olympic Centre, Shenfu Xincheng, Expo Centre and Taoxian Airport.

Alignment and interchanges

The modern tram routes partly run on unreserved track in middle of the road, partly on grass-bed, and partly on raised rail track.

There are interchanges with Shenyang Metro Line 2 – one at Aoti Zhongxin, the other at Baitahelu.

Rolling stock

The fleet consists of two types of trains: a 70% low-floor 3 segment trams and 100% low-floor 5 segment trams. The 70% low-floor 3 segment trams can has a capacity of 301 passengers and is 28.8m long, 2.650m wide with a floor height of 380mm. The first batch consists of 20 70% low-floor trams. Another batch of 5 trams for the Shenfu interurban line were ordered from CRRC Zhuhai. The 10 sets of 100% low floor trams are designed by IFS Design and manufactured by Voith together with CRRC Changchun Railway Vehicles. The 100% low floor trams are 38.4m long.

Incidents and Accidents
 August 15 2013– opening of the first day of 10:00, opened less than one hour, a jeep collided with the same direction from the Olympic Shen Fu new town to start tram.
 August 22 2013– cars and a tram in the National Games in Shenyang and Avenue Rd intersection collision.
 September 2 – Hunnan hail, silver calories tracks submerged, some streetcars forced drove back.
 October 20 – night Line 2 fails, Taoxian airport direction more than one hour late.
 November 25 – the night of the 2nd line of a car fails twice in a row. Afterwards by the operating company to analyse the reasons for the failure "does not alleviate the brake."
 December 24 – tram line 2 two rear-end six people were injured.

See also

 Trams in Shenyang – the first generation tramway network
 Shenyang Metro

References

External links

Great photos of new tramway system in Shenyang

Shenyang
Transport in Shenyang